Shamar Springer (born 26 November 1997) is a Barbadian cricketer. He made his List A debut on 16 January 2015 in the 2014–15 Regional Super50 tournament. In December 2015 he was named in the West Indie's squad for the 2016 Under-19 Cricket World Cup.

He made his first-class debut for Barbados in the 2017–18 Regional Four Day Competition on 14 December 2017.

In June 2018, he was named in the Cricket West Indies B Team squad for the inaugural edition of the Global T20 Canada tournament.

He was the leading wicket-taker for Barbados in the 2018–19 Regional Super50 tournament, with sixteen dismissals in eight matches. In October 2019, he was selected to play for Barbados in the 2019–20 Regional Super50 tournament. In June 2020, he was selected by Barbados, in the players' draft hosted by Cricket West Indies ahead of the 2020–21 domestic season.

References

External links
 

1997 births
Living people
Barbadian cricketers
Barbados cricketers
People from Saint Michael, Barbados
Barbados Royals cricketers
West Indies under-19 cricketers